The Second Australian Recording Industry Association Music Awards (generally known as the ARIA Music Awards or simply The ARIAS) was held on 29 February 1988 at the Sheraton Wentworth Hotel in Sydney. Cliff Richard was the host, with Bryan Ferry, Feargal Sharkey and Ian "Molly" Meldrum included as presenters of the 21 awards. Other presenters were Rudi Grassner (RCA/BMG boss), Col Joye and Richard Wilkins. There were no live performances and the awards were not televised. A shouting match developed between manager Gary Morris, accepting awards for Midnight Oil, and former Countdown compere Meldrum who was presenting.

Some significant changes were made for the second ARIA Awards. In addition to the categories for the inaugural year, "Best Children's Album" was added. The ARIA Hall of Fame was also created, with six acts being inducted: AC/DC, Slim Dusty, Col Joye, Johnny O'Keefe, Dame Joan Sutherland and Vanda & Young. Finally an "Outstanding Achievement Award" was created and first awarded to John Farnham.

Ceremony details

Midnight Oil won "Best Cover Art" for Diesel and Dust and both "Best Single" and "Best Song" for "Beds Are Burning". A shouting match developed between manager Gary Morris, accepting awards for Midnight Oil, and former Countdown compere Ian "Molly" Meldrum who was presenting:

Morris had also objected to ARIA's award category, Best Indigenous Release, as some nominees (including Midnight Oil themselves) had no Indigenous members. Meldrum objected to Morris' political commentary from the podium and the making jokes at the expense of Bryan Ferry who was wearing a (deliberately) crumpled suit:

Karen Middleton of The Canberra Times was disappointed by the ceremony where "[i]nsults flowed almost as freely as the wine and all three of the international guest presenters fell victim to flimsy jokes and foolishness". She felt that Morris was "winner of the unofficial prize for least-liked personality. ... [he] aimed a poor one-liner at British presenter Bryan Ferry". However the "greatest revelation of the evening proved that there are more sore losers in the business than the small screen would lead us to believe. When a winner happened to be a little unpopular, the beautiful people booed".

Awards and nominations

Winners are listed first and bolded, other final nominees (where known) are listed alphabetically.

ARIA Awards
Album of the Year 
Icehouse – Man of Colours
Single of the Year 
Midnight Oil – "Beds Are Burning"
Dave Dobbyn with Herbs – "Slice of Heaven"
Icehouse – "Crazy"
Highest Selling Album 
Icehouse – Man of Colours
Highest Selling Single 
Kylie Minogue – "Locomotion"
Dave Dobbyn with Herbs – "Slice of Heaven"
Best Group 
Crowded House
Hunters & Collectors
Icehouse
INXS
Midnight Oil
Best Female Artist 
Jenny Morris – Body and Soul
Anne Kirkpatrick – Come Back Again
Kate Ceberano
Sharon O'Neill
Shona Laing
Best Male Artist 
John Farnham
Best New Talent 
Weddings Parties Anything – Scorn of the Women
Dave Dobbyn
James Reyne
Lime Spiders
Painters and Dockers
Best Country Album 
Flying Emus – This Town
Anne Kirkpatrick – Come Back Again
Best Indigenous Release 
Gondwanaland – Gondwanaland
Australia all Over – Australia all Over
Flying Emus – This Town
Midnight Oil – Diesel and Dust
Warumpi Band – Go Bush
Best Adult Contemporary Album 
John Farnham – "Touch of Paradise"
Best Comedy Release 
The 12th Man – Wired World of Sports
Garry Who – "Life's Just a Routine"

Fine Arts Awards
Best Jazz Album 
Vince Jones – It All Ends Up in Tears
The Don Burrows Quintet with the Adelaide Connection – Nice 'n' Easy
Best Classical Album 
Voss (Australian Opera) – Voss
Dave Loew and the National Arts Orchestra Australia – Debut
Best Children's Album 
Peter Combe – Toffee Apple
Best Original Soundtrack / Cast / Show Recording 
Original Australian Cast Recording – Nine
Original Motion Picture Soundtrack (Mario Millo) – The Lighthorsemen

Artisan Awards
Song of the Year 
Peter Garrett, Rob Hirst & Jim Moginie – "Beds Are Burning" (Midnight Oil)
Dave Dobbyn – "Slice of Heaven" (Dave Dobbyn with Herbs)
Icehouse – "Crazy"
Producer of the Year 
Mark Opitz
Andrew Farriss
Jon Farriss
Engineer of the Year 
David Nicholas – Richard Clapton – Glory Road, INXS – Kick''
Best Video 
Claudia Castle – Paul Kelly – "To Her Door"
Best Cover Art 
Ken Duncan, Creative Type Wart, Gary Morris, Midnight Oil – Midnight Oil – Diesel and Dust

Outstanding Achievement Award
John Farnham

ARIA Hall of Fame inductees
The inaugural Hall of Fame inductees were:
AC/DC
Slim Dusty
Col Joye
Johnny O'Keefe
Dame Joan Sutherland
Vanda & Young

References

External links
ARIA Awards official website
List of 1988 winners

1988 music awards
1988 in Australian music
ARIA Music Awards